Al Sahla Al Shamaliya is a village in Qatar located in the municipality of Al-Shahaniya.

Etymology
According to the Ministry of Municipality and Environment, the first part of its name, "sahla" (also spelled "sahala") roughly means "vast, expansive plain" in Arabic. The second part of its name, "shamaliya", translates to "northern"; this part denotes its northerly position relative to another area of the same name.

Geography
The village of Umm Al Zubar Al Qibliya is nearby to the east while the village of Umm Wishah is to the west.

References

Populated places in Al-Shahaniya